Nicholas G. Carr (born 1959) is an American writer who has published books 
and articles on technology, business, and culture. His book The Shallows: What the Internet Is Doing to Our Brains was a finalist for the 2011 Pulitzer Prize in General Nonfiction.

Career
Nicholas Carr originally came to prominence with the 2003 Harvard Business Review article "IT Doesn't Matter" and the 2004 book Does IT Matter? Information Technology and the Corrosion of Competitive Advantage (Harvard Business School Press). In these widely discussed works, he argued that the strategic importance of information technology in business has diminished as IT has become more commonplace, standardized and cheaper. His ideas roiled the information technology industry, spurring heated outcries from executives of Microsoft, Intel, Hewlett-Packard and other leading technology companies, although the ideas got mixed responses from other commentators. In 2005, Carr published the controversial article "The End of Corporate Computing" in the MIT Sloan Management Review, in which he argued that in the future companies will purchase information technology as a utility service from outside suppliers.

Carr's second book, The Big Switch: Rewiring the World, From Edison to Google, was published in January 2008 by W. W. Norton. It examines the economic and social consequences of the rise of Internet-based cloud computing, comparing the consequences to those that occurred with the rise of electric utilities in the early 20th century.

In the summer of 2008, The Atlantic published Carr's article "Is Google Making Us Stupid?" as the cover story of its annual Ideas issue. Highly critical of the Internet's effect on cognition, the article has been read and debated widely in both the media and the blogosphere. Carr's main argument is that the Internet may have detrimental effects on cognition that diminish the capacity for concentration and contemplation.

Carr's 2010 book, The Shallows, develops this argument further. Discussing various examples ranging from Nietzsche's typewriter to London cab drivers' GPS navigators, Carr shows how newly introduced technologies change the way people think, act and live. The book focuses on the detrimental influence of the Internet—although it does recognize its beneficial aspects—by investigating how hypertext has contributed to the fragmentation of knowledge. When users search the Web, for instance, the context of information can be easily ignored. "We don't see the trees," Carr writes. "We see twigs and leaves." One of Carr's major points is that the change caused by the Internet involves the physical restructuring of the human brain, which he explains using the notion of "neuroplasticity." In addition to being a Pulitzer Prize nominee, the book appeared on the New York Times nonfiction bestseller list and has been translated into 17 languages.

In 2014, Carr published his fourth book, The Glass Cage: Automation and Us, which presents a critical examination of the role of computer automation in contemporary life. Spanning historical, technical, economic, and philosophical viewpoints, the book has been widely acclaimed by reviewers, with the New York Times Sunday Book Review terming it "essential."

In 2016, Carr published Utopia Is Creepy: and Other Provocations, a collection of blog posts, essays, and reviews from 2005 to 2016. The book provides a critique of modern American techno-utopianism, which TIME magazine said "punches a hole in Silicon Valley cultural hubris."

In 2019, Carr was the Richmond Visiting Professor of Sociology at Williams College. 

Earlier in his career, Carr was executive editor of the Harvard Business Review. He has also served as a member of the editorial board of advisors of Encyclopædia Britannica.

Blog
Through his blog "Rough Type", Carr has been a critic of technological utopianism and in particular the populist claims made for online social production. In his 2005 blog essay titled "The Amorality of Web 2.0," he criticized the quality of volunteer Web 2.0 information projects such as Wikipedia and the blogosphere and argued that they may have a net negative effect on society by displacing more expensive professional alternatives. In a response to Carr's criticism, Wikipedia co-founder Jimmy Wales admitted that the Wikipedia articles quoted by Carr "are, quite frankly, a horrific embarrassment" and solicited recommendations for improving Wikipedia's quality. In May 2007, Carr argued that the dominance of Wikipedia pages in many search results represents a dangerous consolidation of Internet traffic and authority, which may be leading to the creation of what he called "information plantations". Carr coined the term "wikicrats" (a pejorative description of Wikipedia administrators) in August 2007, as part of a more general critique of what he sees as Wikipedia's tendency to develop ever more elaborate and complex systems of rules and bureaucratic rank or caste over time.

Education
Carr holds a B.A. from Dartmouth College and an M.A. in English and American literature and language from Harvard University.

Books
 Digital Enterprise : How to Reshape Your Business for a Connected World (2001) 
 Does IT Matter? (2004) 
 The Big Switch: Rewiring the World, from Edison to Google (2008, W. W. Norton) 
 The Shallows: What the Internet Is Doing to Our Brains (2010, W. W. Norton) 
 The Glass Cage: Automation and Us (2014, W. W. Norton) 
 Utopia Is Creepy: and Other Provocations (2016, W. W. Norton)

See also
 The Shallows
 Is Google Making Us Stupid?
 Carr–Benkler wager

Notes

External links 

 Nicholas Carr's homepage
 Nicholas Carr's weblog
 
 
 The Web Shatters Focus, Rewires Brains by Nicholas Carr
 IT Doesn't matter, originally published in Harvard Business Review
 
 The Argument Over IT May 1, 2004
 Does Nick Carr matter? August 21, 2004
 Nicholas Carr Strikes Again January 23, 2008 ITworld

 
1959 births
Living people
American business writers
American technology writers
Dartmouth College alumni
Critics of Wikipedia
Internet theorists
American male non-fiction writers
Harvard Graduate School of Arts and Sciences alumni